Frank Noonan was formerly State Police Commissioner for the Pennsylvania State Police.  Noonan began his career in 1971 as an agent for the Federal Bureau of Investigation.  Following his retirement from the FBI in 1998, Noonan was appointed as Northeast Regional Director for the Attorney General's Bureau of Narcotics Investigation. After 11 years as Regional Director, Noonan was promoted to Chief of Criminal Investigations for the Office of Attorney General in July 2009.

Noonan was nominated by Governor Tom Corbett on January 18, 2011, to be Commissioner of Pennsylvania State Police and was confirmed by the Pennsylvania State Senate on April 12, 2011.

Noonan served as an officer in the United States Marine Corps during the Vietnam War.  He was awarded a Bronze Star for his service.

He is a graduate of West Chester University of Pennsylvania.

Military career 
Noonan served in the United States Marine Corps during the Vietnam War.

Law enforcement career

Commissioner of the Pennsylvania State Police 
On January 20, 2011 Noonan was appointed as the commissioner of the Pennsylvania State Police by Governor Tom Corbett.

2014 barracks attack 

Noonan and the state police were thrown into the international spot-light after two Troopers were shot outside a State Police barracks in Pike County. Noonan became a national household name after speaking at daily press conferences after the shooting and during the subsequent man hunt for Eric Frein. On September 14, two days after the attack Noonan asked for additions man power and assets from state police agencies in New York and New Jersey. By mid-day on the 15th Noonan had been in touch with numerous federal police agencies and had been talking with high ranking officials within the United States Marshals Service and the Federal Bureau of Investigation.

Noonan continued his media appearing focusing on the suspect, his motive, the state polices response and information on the families involved to national and international media.

Awards and honors

Military citations 
  Bronze Star
  Combat Action Ribbon
  Navy Unit Commendation
  Vietnam Service Medal

Civilian/law enforcement awards 

 PNOA Linda E. Richardson Commitment to Excellence Award
 Pennsylvania Narcotics Officer's Association Agent of the Year

References

Pennsylvania State Police
Living people
American state police officers
State cabinet secretaries of Pennsylvania
Year of birth missing (living people)
West Chester University alumni